Cliff Jones (born 1968 in Hampton Court, London) is a British musician, songwriter, record producer, journalist and educator. Between 1996 and 2002, he was the lead singer of the Britpop band Gay Dad. As a music journalist in the 1990s, he contributed to publications such as Mojo, The Face and Melody Maker.

Early career in journalism
In 1991, Jones began writing for International Musician and the newly established Guitar magazine. The two publications were part of the Northern & Shell group, owned by Richard Desmond. In the early 1990s, he also wrote for Melody Maker.

From 1993, Jones contributed feature articles to the UK style magazine The Face and the men's fashion magazine Arena Homme Plus. He began writing for Mojo in 1994, and went on to contribute cover articles on Pink Floyd, Iggy and the Stooges, and Sly and the Family Stone. Two of his 1994 pieces – one in The Face accompanied by a Union Jack cover featuring Blur, and another focusing on Oasis – were among the earliest articles on what became known as Britpop.

He interviewed many other musical artists. These include: Bryan Ferry, the Velvet Underground, Elton John, the K Foundation, Charlie Watts, the Beach Boys, Beck, My Bloody Valentine, Mark Hollis, George Clinton, Les Paul, Leonard Cohen, the Fugees, Happy Mondays, Fiona Apple, Nirvana, Will Oldham, Terence McKenna, Timothy Leary, Ringo Starr, Ride, Arthur Brown, Coolio, Primal Scream, Sonic Youth, Boo Radleys, Peter Green, Slash, The Ramones, Duff McKagan, and Traci Lords amongst others.

Career as musician
Jones had been writing songs throughout this period. In 1996, he formed the band Gay Dad in London. In September 1997, they signed to London Records, but split up following a world tour in 2002.  Jones went into songwriting and production, bringing the Texas-based band Young Heart Attack to the attention of XL Recordings. He produced and co-wrote their debut album, recording in London and Austin, Texas.

He went on to produce the Golden Virgins' debut album, Songs of Praise, for XL, and the Faceless Werewolves for the same label. Other productions include Scanners' debut for DimMak Recordings, Love Bites for Island Records, (We Are) Performance for Polydor Records, Sia and the Applicators. He has collaborated with Brian Eno, Republica and Mark Owen.

Current activity
Jones continues to produce and write songs for musicians, for film and television advertising as well as managing artists. He also sits on the media executive of the British Academy of Songwriters, Composers and Authors and judges on the annual Ivor Novello Awards. He has been vocal on the issue of copyright infringement on peer-to-peer file sharing networks, and the issues facing songwriters and composers in the current digital economy.

In May 2018, Jones became a Fellow of the Royal Society of Arts. He continues to write on all aspects of the music industry for The Sunday Times, The Times and the Financial Times. He lectures in composition, management and personal development at BIMM in Bristol and Bath Spa University.

Since 2013, Jones has managed the Radiophonic Workshop, (aka BBC Radiophonic Workshop), and also co-manages artists including Keir (Vertigo Records/Island Records) for the Crosstown Concerts

References

1968 births
Living people
British rock singers
British songwriters
British record producers
British music journalists
Musicians from London